Samuel James Hart (born 10 September 1996) is an English professional footballer who plays as a left-back for  club Sutton United.

He began his career at Liverpool, where he made his first-team debut in a pre-season friendly in August 2016. He played on loan at Port Vale during the 2016–17 season, and was sold on to Blackburn Rovers in August 2017. He joined Rochdale on loan in January 2018 and again for the 2018–19 season. He joined Southend United on loan in January 2019 and then loaned out to Shrewsbury Town in January 2020. He joined Southend United on a permanent basis in November 2020 and then signed for Oldham Athletic in June 2021. He later signed for Sutton United 12 months later, at the end of June 2022.

Career

Liverpool
Hart moved from the Manchester United Academy to the Liverpool Academy whilst an under-16 level player. He made his first appearance for Liverpool on 7 August 2016, coming on as a second-half substitute in a 4–0 friendly defeat to Mainz 05 at the Opel Arena.

In August 2016, Hart joined League One side Port Vale on loan for the 2016–17 season, as manager Bruno Ribeiro needed cover for injured duo Kiko and Adam Yates. He made his debut in professional football on 27 August, coming on as an 83rd-minute substitute for Jerome Thomas in a 3–1 win over Scunthorpe United at Vale Park. With Thomas injured, Hart made his first league start on 27 September, playing at left-wing in a 3–1 home win over Millwall. His performance impressed Ribeiro, who stated that Hart played well enough to guarantee himself either the left-back or left-wing spot in the next game. He scored his first goal in senior football on 29 October, in a 3–1 defeat to hometown club Bolton Wanderers at the Macron Stadium. Hart's loan deal was cut short after Michael Brown succeeded Ribeiro as manager in January 2017; he had made 12 starts and four substitute appearances for the "Valiants", often out of position on the left and right-wing. He was reportedly targeted by Grimsby Town for a loan deal in July 2017.

Blackburn Rovers
On 31 August 2017, Hart signed a two-year deal with League One side Blackburn Rovers after he was purchased for an undisclosed fee. On 18 January 2018, he joined fellow League One side Rochdale on loan until the end of the 2017–18 season, having featured just seven times for Tony Mowbray's Rovers. Manager Keith Hill needed cover at left-back having sold Joe Bunney to Northampton Town. Hart featured just three times for the "Dale" during his time at Spotland, though came on as a substitute in the final day win over Charlton Athletic that secured the club's League One status.

On 30 August 2018, Hart returned to Rochdale on loan for the remainder of the 2018–19 season. He said: "I'm really happy. I have got a bond with the football club and the people here, so I am excited to be back". He made 13 appearances, but did not feature after playing in a 4–2 defeat at Oxford United on 27 November, and was recalled to Blackburn on 2 January. On 15 January 2019, he returned to League One, joining Southend United on loan until the end of the 2018–19 season. He made his "Shrimpers" debut four days later, playing at left wing-back in a 4–0 win at Bradford City; after the game manager Chris Powell said that he was pleased with Hart's performance. Hart went on to sign a one-year contract extension at Blackburn the following week, keeping him tied to the club until 2020.

He missed the first half of the 2019–20 season after picking up a hamstring injury in pre-season. On 17 January 2020, Hart joined League One side Shrewsbury Town on loan until the end of the 2019–20 season. "Shrews" manager Sam Ricketts signed him to replace recalled Wolverhampton Wanderers loanee Ryan Giles. He was released by Blackburn manager Tony Mowbray on 24 July 2020.

Southend United
On 11 November 2020, Hart rejoined Southend United, who were now bottom of League Two, on a permanent deal until the end of the 2020–21 season. He was sent off for a strong challenge on Derick Osei during a 0–0 draw with Walsall at Roots Hall on 23 March and handed a three-match ban. However manager Mark Molesley confirmed Southend would appeal the ban. New boss Phil Brown took charge the following month and said Hart was an "outstanding" player who would "definitely be in the standing line up". The club were relegated out of the English Football League after finishing second-bottom of League Two.

Oldham Athletic
On 22 June 2021, Hart signed a one-year deal – with an option to extend – with League Two side Oldham Athletic. Manager Keith Curle stated that as a "typical type of wing-back... he'll have an impact on a regular basis in games" and would "become an important part of the team". He scored his second career goal on 20 November, to secure a 3–2 win over former club Port Vale at Boundary Park. Curle was sacked in November and the "Latics" form improved after John Sheridan replaced interim manager Selim Benachour in January. However Oldham were relegated at the end of the 2021–22 season and Hart took to social media to say it would "hurt for a long time". Oldham offered him a new contract, which he turned down.

Sutton United
Hart remained in League Two after he agreed a two-year deal with Sutton United on 28 June 2022, with manager Matt Gray looking to provide competition for left-back Robert Milsom.

Style of play
Hart was described by the Liverpool website as "a left-back, who relishes going forward and poses a real threat when pushing on down the flank", and someone who "can carry the attack with his fine athletic profile – but he's also very strong in the tackle".

Career statistics

References

External links

1996 births
Living people
Footballers from Bolton
English footballers
Association football fullbacks
Association football wingers
Liverpool F.C. players
Port Vale F.C. players
Blackburn Rovers F.C. players
Rochdale A.F.C. players
Southend United F.C. players
Shrewsbury Town F.C. players
Oldham Athletic A.F.C. players
Sutton United F.C. players
English Football League players